This is a list of NUTS-3 regions in EU which have a Nominal GDP per capita over €100,000.

See also 

List of European regions by GDP
List of NUTS regions in the European Union by GDP
List of countries by GDP (nominal) per capita

References

NUTS 3 statistical regions of the European Union